Drawing Black Lines is the second studio album by the American band Project 86. The success of their debut, especially the song "Pipe Dream", attracted the attention of several major record labels. Originally released on BEC Recordings on March 21, 2000, the album was reissued with Atlantic Records branding after the major label signed the band.

Reception

AllMusic has described the album as "a testimony to Christendom while musically driving a fist through traditional Christian thinking." Lyrically, the album takes a different thread from its predecessor, turning the mirror of introspection into a window viewing society at large. The music also shows significant gains in maturity as well, advancing from a rapcore sound to one classified as metalcore or alternative metal.

One reviewer comments that "Moral lines are drawn beginning to end on this disc." Lyricist Andrew Schwab states that "Drawing Black Lines is not just a catch phrase or an album title... When I am faced with challenges, my true character is revealed. And only by drawing a definite line, which separates me from every wrong choice, will I be able to be all I am meant to be."

The BEC and Atlantic pressings are virtually the same. The original BEC version has a full-color booklet with a fold out on both ends of band photos. The Atlantic version is condensed into regular pages and for some reason is only in black and white. There are also minor alterations in the album artwork, as well as the CD itself.

Track list

Personnel

Andrew Schwab – vocals
Randy Torres – guitar, vocals, piano
Steven Dail – bass, guitar
Alex Albert – drums
GGGarth – producer, additional engineer
Brandon Ebel - executive producer
Andre Wahl - engineer, mixing
Chris Vaughn Jones - additional engineer
Scott Ternan - recording assistant
Roger Swan - mixing assistant
Sleepy J - digital editing
Alex (the Amazing Condor) Aligizakis - assisted with digital editing
FU - programmer
Richard Leighton - guitar technician
Chris Crippin - drum technician
Brian "Big Bass" Gardener - mastering
Shuji - band photography
Happenstance - sleeve design

References

Project 86 albums
2000 albums
Atlantic Records albums
Albums produced by Garth Richardson